John Stanton may refer to:

John Stanton (actor) (born 1944), Australian actor
John W. Stanton, founder and former CEO of Western Wireless Corporation
John Stanton (journalist), American journalist and writer
 J. William Stanton (1924–2002), Republican congressman from Ohio
John Stanton (cricketer) (1901–1973), English cricketer